Pompei Scavi-Villa dei Misteri is a railway station in Pompei, Italy, on the Naples-Sorrento line of the Circumvesuviana commuter rail system.

Location
Pompei Scavi is the closest station to the famous ruins of the Ancient Roman city of Pompeii, with the ruins across the street from the main station building.

Station layout
Pompei Scavi station consists of two tracks with two side platforms; platform 1 serves trains to Sorrento while platform 2 serves trains to Naples.

See also
Circumvesuviana
Pompeii
Villa of the Mysteries

References

External links
 Official station page
 Stazioni del Mondo: Pompei Scavi-Villa dei Misteri

Railway stations in Campania
Pompei
Buildings and structures in the Metropolitan City of Naples
Railway stations in Italy opened in the 21st century